Goleba puella is the type species of jumping spider in the genus Goleba. The species has been identified in Angola, Congo, Ghana, Kenya and South Africa. It was first described by Eugène Simon in 1885. Initially  placed in the genus Asemonea , the species was moved to Goleba in 1980 by Fred Wanless.

References

Salticidae
Spiders described in 1885
Spiders of Africa
Taxa named by Eugène Simon